The balicassiao (Dicrurus balicassius) is a species of passerine bird in the family Dicruridae.
It is endemic to the Philippines.

Its natural habitat is subtropical or tropical moist lowland forests.

Description
Medium size, sexes alike, races differ in size, abraensis is the largest, and in being all black abraensis and balicassius or having white lower breast and belly mirabilis.

Taxonomy
In 1760 the French zoologist Mathurin Jacques Brisson included a description of the balicassiao in his Ornithologie based on a specimen collected in the Philippines. He used the French name Le choucas des Philippines and the Latin Monedula Philippensis. Although Brisson coined Latin names, these do not conform to the binomial system and are not recognised by the International Commission on Zoological Nomenclature. When in 1766 the Swedish naturalist Carl Linnaeus updated his Systema Naturae for the twelfth edition, he added 240 species that had been previously described by Brisson. One of these was the balicassiao. Linnaeus included a brief description, coined the binomial name Corvus balicassius and cited Brisson's work. The specific name balicassius is from Balicasiao, the Cebuano word for this bird. This species is now placed in the genus Dicrurus  that was introduced by French ornithologist Louis Jean Pierre Vieillot in 1816. There are three subspecies.

References

Drongos
Birds of the Philippines
Endemic fauna of the Philippines
Birds described in 1766
Taxa named by Carl Linnaeus
Taxonomy articles created by Polbot